Wild Horses is an American country music band composed of Lon Holland (accordion, percussion), Steve Kellough (bass guitar), Michael Blake Mahler (lead guitar, vocals), Ralph McCauley (drums), Angela Rae (lead vocals), and Chris Sigmon (Dobro). Mahler and Rae are husband and wife, and guitarist Joe Lee Koenig was formerly a member.

Founded in 1989 in the state of Texas, the band signed to Epic Records in 2002, releasing their debut single "I Will Survive" that year. The song went on to peak at No. 46 on the Billboard Hot Country Singles & Tracks (now Hot Country Songs) charts, and was included on a compilation album entitled Dancin' with Thunder, which was issued in association with Professional Bull Riders. An album, Frontier Free for All, was released in 2003 on Persimmon Records.

Discography

Albums

Singles

Music videos

References

External links
Official website

Musical groups established in 1989
Country music groups from Texas